, real name Masato Indou, is a fictional character introduced in the 2006 video game .hack//G.U. Vol. 1: Rebirth by CyberConnect2. He is also one of the main characters in the prequel anime .hack//Roots by Bee Train. Ovan first appears in Rebirth as a player character from the online game "The World" saving the protagonist Haseo from player killers. Ovan is introduced as the creator of a guild known as the Twilight Brigade who recruited Haseo and other players until he went missing for unknown reason. He later helps Haseo in his revenge quest against the player killer Tri-Edge who sent their friend Shino into a coma. Across the video games, Ovan looks over Haseo's quest to defeat Tri-Edge, hoping his former subordinate will develop an unknown power. He has also appeared in the games' printed media, including the manga, light novels, among other titles related with .hack.

CyberConnect2 CEO Hiroshi Matsuyama created Ovan alongside character designer Seiichiro Hosokawa. In describing Ovan, Matsuyama refrained from revealing information about him, but referred to Ovan as one of the most important characters from the trilogy due to how he looks after Haseo. While Ovan remains as an ally to Haseo in the original games, Matsuyama wanted Ovan to be a more aggressive character in the original video animation as an alternate take of the theme of revenge. Ovan is voiced by Hiroki Tōchi.

Critical reception to Ovan's role in the games and the anime earned positive response due to his mystery traits as well as mentorship over Haseo alongside other members from the Twilight Brigade. However, critics were more divided in regards to Ovan's role in Trilogy as he remains unlikable for constantly manipulating Haseo and wounding people around regardless of his wish.

Creation and development

In regards to his visual appearance, Haseo and Ovan were designed by Seiichiro Hosokawa. They both were Hosokawa's first creations upon becoming a professional especially during his rookie days at CyberConnect2. When asked about his favorite character, Matsuyama found both Ovan and Haseo as these, considering the games tend to focus on each, but more specifically on Haseo. Hosokawa found Ovan and Haseo's designs difficult to make in contrast to the one of Azure Kite. The second game was titled "The Voice That Thinks of You" with the director citing multiple relationships, including how Haseo remembers Shino's voice, how Atoli thinks of Haseo but the one more important was Ovan's relationship with Haseo. In the remasterization of the series, a new chapter shows Ovan becoming Haseo's ally. One of the parody scenes involves Haseo getting married with Ovan for which Itsuki Hoshi designed an alternate take of Haseo wearing a wedding dress. Most of the female staff members from CyberConnect2 argued who would wear the wedding dress in the making of it.

For Trilogy, Matsuyama wanted to give importance was Ovan in contrast to his previous incarnation from the games. In contrast to the original games where Ovan becomes an ally to Haseo, the Trilogy OVA was written with the opposite result. Haseo's character arc in the movie comes in the form of how he is obsessed with violence during his struggles with Ovan and thus reaches his Xth Form when coming on terms with the flaws of his ways. Matsuyama felt this take on Haseo was well executed as the director aimed show the issues of revenge Haseo had with Ovan. When it comes to the fighting game .hack//Versus, Matsuyama recommended Ovan to advanced players.

In Japanese Ovan is voiced by Ryosei Konishi in the first game and Hiroki Tōchi in following titles. When first recording the games and .hack//Roots, Tōchi little knowledge about Ovan's character. As a result, when he learned more information about him, Tōchi felt glad to voice him again in Trilogy as now he knew the traits behind Ovan. He claimed he was deeply joyed by this work, especially praising the animation CyberConnect2 produced for the OVA. In retrospective Tōchi felt the work of .hack//G.U. memorable and was further satisfied with Trilogy. In the English version of the games, Jamieson Price voices Ovan while Michael Kopsa dubbed him in Roots.

Appearances

In the .hack//G.U. games
Ovan is a Steam Gunner who leads the Twilight Brigade. He never shares any personal things to anyone with the exception of Shino, who knows him in the real world. Ovan's arm is encased in a lock, which leads to others thinking that he is a hacker. He is first introduced as the leader of the Twilight Brigade who wanted the newcomer Haseo to join his quest during the events of .hack//Roots, but during a quest to find Key of the Twilight, Ovan went missing for unknown reason. When he returned, he found his guild is no more and Shino falling into a coma after an encounter with the player killer Tri-Edge, which led Haseo into becoming PKKer (Player Killer Killer).

During the .hack//G.U., Ovan motivates Haseo to become stronger in order to defeat Tri-Edge and the virus AIDA responsible for sending Shino into a coma among others while giving clues about AIDA and the Epitaph users. During the second installment, it is revealed that inside the lock is a black hatchet-like weapon in his hand and a long black blade coming out of his shoulders. This is revealed to be the AIDA known as Tri-Edge, who PKed Shino, making Ovan the PKer that Haseo has been looking for. Ovan wants to save the first victim of his arm, his little sister, Aina. He tried to find Key of Twilight by forming Twilight Brigade to save her. However, when this quest failed, Ovan seeks to purge the system of AIDA with his Avatar's Rebirth ability, which can only be used after the defeat of his Avatar Corbenik at the hands of Haseo using the power of Skeith and the other phases. 

In defeat, Ovan is able to use his Avatar's special ability "The Rebirth" which completely resets the Internet and cleanses it of AIDA and awaken several comatose victims, though he falls into a coma as a result and there are still players, including Shino, who have yet to regain their consciousness. During the final battle against Cubia, Ovan briefly awaken and help Haseo to deliver the final blow before disappearing once more. An hidden ending in the Forest of Pain shows Haseo a vision of Ovan; Haseo declares that they will meet again. He is seen again in the original video animation "Returner" where he and Aina are reunited.

In the HD release of the trilogy, a new chapter involves Haseo working with Pi to find a way to awake Ovan. Ovan's PC is found frozen in the World as his body remains in a coma in the real world. With this newfound "5th Form", Haseo and a female PC known as Kusabira are successful at reviving Ovan, with the latter being revealed as the personification of the AIDA Tri-Edge. With their Avatars combined,  Haseo and Ovan to defeat a creature named Vegalta who had been threatening The World. Afterwards, Ovan is reunited with his sister and Shino. On the last day of The World, the two go on a final quest to remember their old times in the Twilight Brigade.

Other appearances
The anime .hack//Roots details Ovan's time at the Twilight Brigade starting with how he aims to recruit Haseo after saving him from the player killers. Ovan seeks the Ovan Key of the Twilight. On his road steps into a trap set by Naobi and the rest of TaN. Ovan is left captive, with his PC data being read by Naobi. The Twilight Brigade disbands with only Shino and Haseo waiting for him. Ovan returns in like in the game's second scene where he finds Haseo and leads him to fight Azure Kite under the idea his enemy is the true Tri-Edge.

In the manga version of the games, Ovan also reappears in the Haseo's battle against Cubia but he remains in The World following its defeat. After making peace with Shino, Ovan implies he might be dead in the real world and is only living in the form of data but Haseo decides not listen to the truth. In the light novels, Ovan remembers more about Haseo's time as a player in the game when looking after him. In the original video animation .hack//G.U. Trilogy, Ovan is portrayed in a more antagonistic way, killing most Avatar users in order to force Haseo's growth. Atoli uses her Avatar's power to send Haseo into the sea of data to save Ovan. The last scene shows Aina playing on a field with Ovan happily. 

He is also present in the video game .hack//Link welcoming the protagonist Tokio as a new member of Twilight Brigade. Across the story, as Aina is healed, Ovan starts a relationship with Shino. Tales of Graces protagonist Asbel Lhant can wear a costume based on Ovan. He is also playable in the fighting game .hack//Versus.

Reception

Critical reception to Ovan has been positive in the games. GamesRadar found Ovan as enigmatic character whose design seem to imply further mystery related to narrative and commented that his calm and collected personality clashes with Haseo's bad mannerism properly. Haseo's chase to free Ovan in Last Recode was praised by WCCFtech as finding Ovan gave the game series a proper epilogue. HardcoreGamer agreed, finding it as a big closure to the games' narrative. Jatokun praised Last Recode for giving Ovan as supporting character for the first time as much behind him was kept in secrets alongside AIDA during the second installment. In retrospective, the reviewer felt that the third installment helped to explain properly Ovan's agenda and his relationship with Haseo. In a popularity poll from the franchise, Ovan was voted as the 6th best character.

DVDTalk.com enjoyed Ovan's characterization in Roots as his influence and actions with the Twilight Brigade made the television series feel as appealing as .hack//Sign, a previous anime that focused on human relationships rather than action. The reviewer later noted how appealing was in the a future episodes as the group split following Ovan's disappearance with poor chance of finding the item they wanted rather issues with battles. Although the character reappears in later episodes, his action were noted to be kept in mystery as he barely interacted with his friends. UK Anime Network described Ovan as a "a mysterious man in Lennon-style glasses who sports a cannon for an arm" and noted that the character's attachment to Haseo left potential for mystery in regards to why he invited to his guild. Mania Entertainment shared similar comments in regards to Ovan's mysterious personality as sometimes he behaves softly and in other situations brooding. He also found Ovan's interest in Haseo was one of the big appeals in the series as it implies further mysteries behind Haseo too. Anime News Network felt that the idea Ovan disappearing, leaving the Twilight Brigade to talk to themselves might not bring an interesting impact.

In contrast to the games and Roots, Ovan earned mixed responses for his role in Trilogy. Despite The Fandom Post having mixed thoughts about the narrative from Trilogy due to the idea of the film feeling rushed as a result of employing multiple characters not present from Roots but felt Haseo's interactions with Ovan and Atoli are the best points. Capsule Monsters  praised Ovan's Haseo's fastspaced fights. Anime News Network panned Ovan due to his hidden nature as he continuously manipulates Haseo into accomplishing his mission and that "the long-overdue revelation of his true goals isn't nearly enough to make me [the reviewer] care about what happens to him". Jeuxact still felt he was likable due to the secret nature behind his secrets in contrast to Haseo's characterization. In a review of the series' manga, Manga News found that Ovan's revelation to be the true Tri-Edge helped to bring  Roots to a closure, something the anime left open for the game. Nevertheless, the reviewer felt Ovan's battle to feel rushed in the manga version.

References

Fictional swordfighters in video games
Male characters in video games
Role-playing video game characters
Science fantasy video game characters
Video game characters introduced in 2006
Video game bosses
Male characters in anime and manga